John Jenkins (January 3, 1931 – July 12, 1993) was an American jazz saxophonist.

Career 
Born in Chicago, Jenkins initially studied clarinet in high school but switched to saxophone after six months on the instrument. He played in jam sessions led by Joe Segal at Roosevelt College from 1949-1956. He played with Art Farmer in 1955 and led his own group in Chicago later that year. In 1957, he played with Charles Mingus and recorded two albums as a leader. He played as a sideman with Johnny Griffin, Donald Byrd, Hank Mobley, Paul Quinichette, Clifford Jordan, Sahib Shihab, and Wilbur Ware in the late 1950s and early 1960s, but essentially dropped out of music after 1962, aside from a few dates with Gloria Coleman.

After leaving the jazz world he worked as a messenger in New York and dabbled in jewelry; he sold brass objects at street fairs in the 1970s. After 1983, he began practicing again and playing live on street corners; shortly before he died he played with Clifford Jordan.

Discography

As leader
Alto Madness (Prestige, 1957) - with Jackie McLean
Jenkins, Jordan and Timmons (New Jazz, 1957) - with Clifford Jordan and Bobby Timmons 
John Jenkins with Kenny Burrell (Blue Note, 1957)
Jazz Eyes (Regent, 1957) (Reissued as Donald Byrd - Star Eyes (Savoy 1976)

As sideman
With Teddy Charles
Coolin' (New Jazz, 1957)
With Clifford Jordan
Cliff Jordan (Blue Note, 1957)
Play What You Feel (Mapleshade, 1990 [1997])
With Hank Mobley
Hank (Blue Note, 1957)
With Paul Quinichette
On the Sunny Side (Prestige, 1957)
With Sahib Shihab
The Jazz We Heard Last Summer (Savoy, 1957)
With Wilbur Ware
The Chicago Sound (Riverside, 1957) (aka, The Chicago Cookers (Jazzland LP 12))

References

1931 births
1993 deaths
American jazz saxophonists
American male saxophonists
Musicians from Chicago
Savoy Records artists
Blue Note Records artists
20th-century American saxophonists
Jazz musicians from Illinois
20th-century American male musicians
American male jazz musicians